Sylvain White (born 21 December 1971) is a French film director and screenwriter.

Life and career
White attended Pomona College, graduating in 1998.

He debuted his feature film, Stomp the Yard, at number one in the US. He went on to direct the action comedy The Losers, starring Chris Evans, Idris Elba and Zoe Saldana. He wrote and directed the French murder mystery film The Mark of the Angels, starring Gérard Depardieu.

White has also directed episodes on television series such as The Americans, CSI, Hawaii Five-0, The Following, Person of Interest, Major Crimes and Sleepy Hollow.

Filmography

Short films

Films

Television

References

External links

English-language film directors
French film directors
French music video directors
Place of birth missing (living people)
Year of birth missing (living people)
Living people
Pomona College alumni